The straightfin barb ('Enteromius paludinosus) is a species of ray-finned fish in the  family Cyprinidae. E. pleurogramma'' is sometimes included here, but while it is certainly extremely closely related, it appears to be a distinct cryptic species.

The straightfin barb is found in Burundi, Kenya, Malawi, Tanzania, and Uganda.

Its natural habitats are rivers, freshwater lakes, freshwater marshes, and inland deltas.

It is not considered a threatened species by the IUCN.

References

Enteromius
Cyprinid fish of Africa
Fish of Burundi
Freshwater fish of Kenya
Fish of Malawi
Freshwater fish of Tanzania
Fish of Uganda
Fish described in 1852
Taxa named by Wilhelm Peters
Taxonomy articles created by Polbot